= Sukivali =

Village in Maharashtra

- Village
- Interactive map of Sukivali
- Coordinates: 17°42′46″N 73°27′24″E
- Country: India
- State: Maharashtra

Sukivali is a small village in Ratnagiri district, Maharashtra state in Western India. The 2011 Census of India recorded a total of 2,196 residents in the village. Sukivali's geographical area is 819 hectares (2,020 acres).
